The 1919 Mercer Baptists football team represented Mercer University as a member of the Southern Intercollegiate Athletic Association (SIAA) during the 1919 college football season. The team played just two games, losing both badly. The team was optimistic before the Florida game.

Schedule

References

Mercer
Mercer Bears football seasons
College football winless seasons
Mercer Baptists football